Ademar José Tavares Júnior (born 20 September 1980 in Jaboatão), known as Ademar or  Ademar Júnior, is a retired Brazilian football defender. Ademar plays on the left of defence or as a midfielder.

Career

Cherno More
After spending the first nine years of his career in his home country with Sport Club do Recife, Náutico, Guarani, Brasiliense, Ceará, Oeste and ABC, Ademar relocated to Bulgaria in June, 2009, signing a two-year contract with Cherno More Varna. He took number 3 and made his team debut on July 7, in a friendly game against Levski Sofia. Ademar made his competitive debut a month later, in a Europa League match against PSV Eindhoven on August 6, 2009.

During his first season in Cherno More, Ademar played in various other positions for his club, mainly as a left midfielder. On March 1, 2010, Ademar scored his first goal for the team in a match against Chernomorets Burgas. He also scored twice for Cherno More in their 2–1 win away to Lokomotiv Sofia on April 25, 2010.
On 17 October 2010, he was sent off in the 3:2 win against Slavia Sofia.

CSKA Sofia
On 1 June 2011, Milen Radukanov announced that Ademar had signed a contract with CSKA Sofia. The Brazilian made his official debut on 7 August 2011, in the 2:1 away win over Lokomotiv Sofia in an A PFG match. He sustained a waist injury in early April 2012, for which he underwent surgery at the “Acibadem” sports clinic in Istanbul and which saw him out of action until the end of the year. Eventually his contract with CSKA was cancelled after some financial disagreements with the club and he returned to Brazil, joining Porto de Caruaru.

Club statistics

References

External links

 Profile at 7m.cn
 

1980 births
Living people
Brazilian footballers
Brazilian expatriate footballers
Sport Club do Recife players
Clube Náutico Capibaribe players
Guarani FC players
Brasiliense Futebol Clube players
Ceará Sporting Club players
Oeste Futebol Clube players
ABC Futebol Clube players
PFC Cherno More Varna players
PFC CSKA Sofia players
First Professional Football League (Bulgaria) players
Brazilian expatriate sportspeople in Bulgaria
Expatriate footballers in Bulgaria
Sportspeople from Maranhão
People from Jaboatão dos Guararapes
Association football defenders
Sportspeople from Pernambuco
21st-century Brazilian people